Drosera schmutzii is a perennial tuberous species in the genus Drosera that is native to New South Wales, South Australia, and Victoria. It grows in a rosette 3 to 4 cm in diameter with green to red leaves. It is entirely endemic to Kangaroo Island in South Australia and occurs mostly in the northern and eastern areas. It grows in sandy clay with laterite soils in open areas amongst Allocasuarina muelleriana and often in the presence of Stylidium tepperianum. It flowers from June to September.

It was first discovered in September 2002 by Father Erwin Schmutz, for whom the species is named. It was also collected and informally described by C. Clayton in 2003. It was then grown in cultivation for several years while further specimens were examined and finally formally described by Allen Lowrie and John Godfrey Conran in 2008. It differs from Drosera whittakeri by its very narrow eglandular petioles, semi-erect leaves, and presence of a few whorled leaves separated from the main basal rosette of leaves.

See also 
List of Drosera species

References 

Carnivorous plants of Australia
Caryophyllales of Australia
schmutzii
Flora of South Australia
Plants described in 2008